The  1976 United States Senate election in Tennessee took place on November 2, 1976. Incumbent Republican U.S. Senator Bill Brock ran for re-election to a second term, but was defeated by Democratic challenger Jim Sasser.

Major Candidates

Republican
Bill Brock, Incumbent U.S. Senator since 1971

Democratic
Jim Sasser, attorney and Democratic activist
John Jay Hooker, Attorney and candidate for Governor in 1966 and nominee in 1970

Results

See also 
 1976 United States Senate elections

References

Tennessee
1976
1976 Tennessee elections